Southland Mall is a shopping mall in Hayward, California owned and managed by Brookfield Properties. The mall is anchored by JCPenney, and Macy's (formerly Liberty House). There is also a vacant anchors left by Sears and Dick's Sporting Goods, which prior to Dick's was Kohl's, and way before Mervyn's. The mall is primarily a single-level structure, with a small lower level beneath JCPenney, a movie theater, and free standing restaurants in the outlying parking areas. The center is located off Interstate 880 at Winton Avenue, at the western end of the city.

On July 10, 2020, it was announced that Sears would be closing as part of a plan to close 28 stores nationwide.

Most of Southland was developed in the early 1960s. The site incorporated a freestanding Sears location and a few other stores operating as the Palma Ceia Center (Palma Ceia being Portuguese for "Palm Supper", a reflection of the ethnic Portuguese heritage of Oakland and its newly developing suburbs) and a $20 million expansion program was announced in the fall of 1963, in which the facility would become an enclosed mall. The Taubman Company was the primary developer (the developer of Chicago's Evergreen Plaza was also a partner) and John Graham (architect of Seattle's Space Needle) the primary architect.

References

External links
Southland Mall website
Southland Mall at bigmallrat blog
Southland Mall at labelscar.com website

Buildings and structures in Hayward, California
Brookfield Properties
Shopping malls in the San Francisco Bay Area
Shopping malls established in 1964
Shopping malls in Alameda County, California
Economy of Hayward, California